Furkan Külekçi (born 28 June 2001) is a Turkish football player who plays as a forward for Niğde Anadolu on loan from Kasımpaşa.

Professional career
Külekçi is a youth product of Eyüpspor and Kasımpaşa, and signed his first professional contract with the latter in December 2020. He made his professional debut with Kasımpaşa in a 3-0 Süper Lig loss to Fenerbahçe on 4 January 2021.

References

External links
 
 
 Mackolik Profile

2001 births
Sportspeople from Giresun
21st-century Turkish people
Living people
Turkish footballers
Association football forwards
Kasımpaşa S.K. footballers
Edirnespor footballers
Niğde Anadolu FK footballers
Süper Lig players
TFF Third League players